Strekov is a village and municipality in the Nové Zámky District in the Nitra Region of south-west Slovakia.

Geography
The municipality lies at an altitude of 132 metres and covers an area of 41.055 km.

History
In historical records the village was first mentioned in 1075.
After the Austro-Hungarian army disintegrated in November 1918, Czechoslovak troops occupied the area, later acknowledged internationally by the Treaty of Trianon. Between 1938 and 1945 Strekov once more  became part of Miklós Horthy's Hungary through the First Vienna Award. From 1945 until the Velvet Divorce, it was part of Czechoslovakia. Since then it has been part of Slovakia.

Population
It has a population of about 2,215 people. The ethnic composition of the population is about 89% Hungarian, 10% Slovak and 1% Romani.

Facilities
The village has a small public library a gym and a football pitch.

References

External links
 Strekov – Nové Zámky Okolie

Villages and municipalities in Nové Zámky District
Hungarian communities in Slovakia